David Goodall may refer to:

* David Goodall (botanist) (1914–2018), Australian botanist, ecologist, and advocate of legalized voluntary euthanasia
 David Goodall (diplomat) (1931–2016), British diplomat
 David Goodall (director) (born 1964), Scottish film director, producer and actor
 David Goodall (chemist), British chemist, professor emeritus at University of York